Kikarwali is a small village and a Gram panchayat in Raisinghnagar, a sub-district in the Indian state of Rajasthan.

References

Villages in Sri Ganganagar district